Jim Chu, COM is a former-Chief Constable of the Vancouver Police Department (VPD). On June 21, 2007, Chu was named as the successor of Chief Constable Jamie Graham. On January 23, 2015, it was announced Chu was planning to retire after a 36-year career with Vancouver Police  and he did officially do so on May 6, 2015, upon the swearing-in of his successor, Adam Palmer.

Biography 

Chu grew up in East Vancouver, the second oldest of four children of immigrants from Shanghai. He graduated from Sir Charles Tupper Secondary School, where he played rugby, in 1978. A fellow alumni of Sir Charles Tupper was the gangster Bindy Johal, a man whom Chu was to pursue as a policeman. Joining the police department a year after his high-school graduation, he continued his education at the same time, earning a Bachelor of Business Administration from Simon Fraser University and an MBA from the University of British Columbia. His police training includes the FBI Advanced SWAT course and the FBI National Executive Institute.

Chu has served in a number of investigative and support roles. As Sergeant in charge of recruiting, he developed the VPD's applicant guide and the department's first website in 1996. In 1997, he became an Inspector, and since then has supervised a number of transitions in the VPD's electronic communications technology, including the introduction of its current radio system and mobile computing system. In 2001, he was given command of District 4, which roughly corresponds to the Southwest quarter of Vancouver. Chu became a deputy chief in 2003, in charge of the Support Services division, which handles human resources, information technology, planning and communications. It also includes the department's Financial Services Section, and he has earned recognition for his role in dealing with the department's cost overruns. In July 2007, he was placed in charge of the Operations Support division, which oversees criminal intelligence, emergency response and the gang and drug squads.

He is the author of a 2001 book, Law Enforcement Information Technology.

In May 2007, the Governor General of Canada awarded Chu the Order of Merit of Police Forces for service beyond the call of duty. In 2015, he was promoted to the rank of Commander of the Order of Merit. In 1999 he received the Super Trustee award from the British Columbia Library Trustees Association. In 2010, he was named one of 25 Transformation Canadians by the Globe and Mail/La Presse, and received an Outstanding Alumni Award from Simon Fraser University. In May 2015, he became the first municipal police senior officer in B.C. to be granted a Commission.

On June 21, 2007, Chu was named as the successor of  Chief Constable Jamie Graham, who was set to retire in August. Chu assumed command of the department on August 14, the day after the police fatally shot Paul Boyd (animator) on Granville Street.

Chu served as Chief Constable during the 2010 Winter Olympics and he was Chief Constable of Vancouver as riots erupted in downtown Vancouver at the conclusion of game seven of the 2011 Stanley Cup final.

He was elected for a two-year term as President of the Canadian Association of Chiefs of Police in 2013 and advocated for a ticketing option for possession of small amount of marijuana and better training for police officers to serve the mentally ill.

As he wound down his 36-year policing career, with almost eight years as Chief Constable, he was especially proud of the falling crime in the city, improved relations with marginalized people in the Downtown Eastside and with Vancouver's First Nations community, and the VPD's work in advocating for the mentally ill. On May 25, 2015, he became the first municipal police officer in BC to receive the Police Officer Commission – a new provincial honour that recognizes for senior officers of their rank, professionalism and dedication to policing in B.C.

In July 2015, Chu joined the Aquilini Investment Group as a Vice President.

He has also served on the Board of TransLink.

In July 2021 Chu was appointed to Board Chair of the BC Emergency Health Services by BC Minister of Health, Adrian Dix.

Books

References

External links
 Vancouver names Jim Chu as new police chief at CTV.ca, Fri. Jun. 22 2007 (retrieved July 16, 2007)
 Vancouver, meet your new police chief by Doug Ward and Kelly Sinoski, Vancouver Sun, Thursday, June 21, 2007 (retrieved July 22, 2007)
 Incoming police chief Jim Chu gets plenty of free advice By Carlito Pablo, Georgia Straight, August 2, 2007 (retrieved August 4, 2007)
 Meet Jim Chu – Vancouver's new top cop by Christina Montgomery, The Province, Thursday, June 21, 2007. (retrieved July 4, 2007)
Jim Chu brings nice-guy style to the job by Frances Bula, Vancouver Sun, Friday, June 22, 2007 (Retrieved July 8, 2007)
 Vancouver chief to civilians: ‘I’m sorry we could not back you up’ by Robert Matas, Rod Mickleburgh and Wendy Stueck (retrieved 19 June 2011)
'Criminals, anarchists, thugs' behind post-Cup riot by Darcy Wintonyk (Retrieved, 19 June 2011)

 

1959 births
Living people
Chinese emigrants to Canada
Naturalized citizens of Canada
People from Shanghai
People from Vancouver
Simon Fraser University alumni
UBC Sauder School of Business alumni
Vancouver police chiefs